Cyclone Creek is a stream in the U.S. state of South Dakota.

Cyclone Creek was the scene of a tornado (cyclone), hence the name.

See also
List of rivers of South Dakota

References

Rivers of Corson County, South Dakota
Rivers of South Dakota